The 1980 Austrian Grand Prix was a Formula One motor race held on 17 August 1980 at the Österreichring circuit in Austria. It was the tenth race of the 1980 Formula One season. The race was the 13th Austrian Grand Prix and the eleventh to be held at the Österreichring. The race was held over 54 laps of the 5.942-kilometre circuit for a total race distance of 321 kilometres.

The race was won by French driver, Jean-Pierre Jabouille driving a Renault RE20. The win was Jabouille's second and last Formula One Grand Prix victory. It was also his first points finish in over a year since his previous victory at the 1979 French Grand Prix. It would also be the last points finish of his career. Jabouille won by eight-tenths of a second over Australian driver Alan Jones driving a Williams FW07B. Third was Jones' Williams teammate, Argentine driver Carlos Reutemann.

At the high-altitude circuit the turbocharged Renaults dominated qualifying, with René Arnoux securing pole over Jabouille but Jones won the start, leading until Arnoux took over on lap 3. Arnoux pitted for tyres on lap 21 handing Jabouille the lead he only just kept and Jones fell just short as Jabouille limped home on wrecked tyres.

Behind Reutemann, French driver Jacques Laffite was fourth in his Ligier JS11/15 with Brazilian driver Nelson Piquet (Brabham BT49) and Italian driver Elio de Angelis (Lotus 81) completing the points finishers. Team Lotus ran a third car for debutant British driver Nigel Mansell. The future world champion retired with a broken engine after 40 laps and suffering burns after he raced in overalls soaked in fuel after a pre-race incident. West German driver Jochen Mass did not make the start, crashing and rolling his Arrows A3 and injuring himself in practice.

Jones now led Piquet by eleven points, Reutemann by 17 and Laffite by 19. Williams now led Ligier in the constructors' championship by 26 points and Brabham by 41.

Classification

Qualifying

Race

Championship standings after the race 

Drivers' Championship standings

Constructors' Championship standings

Note: Only the top five positions are included for both sets of standings.

References

Austrian Grand Prix
Grand Prix
Austrian Grand Prix
Austrian Grand Prix